Hempcrete or hemplime is biocomposite material, a mixture of hemp hurds (shives) and lime, sand, or pozzolans, which is used as a material for construction and insulation. It is marketed under names like Hempcrete, Canobiote, Canosmose, Isochanvre and IsoHemp. Hempcrete is easier to work with than traditional lime mixes and acts as an insulator and moisture regulator. It lacks the brittleness of concrete and consequently does not need expansion joints. Typically, hempcrete has good thermal and acoustic insulation capabilities, but low mechanical performance, specifically compressive strength. In addition, hempcrete’s mechanical properties, when used in prefabricated blocks specifically, act as a carbon sink throughout its lifetime. The result is a lightweight insulating material, finishing plaster, or a non-load bearing wall, ideal for most climates as it combines insulation and thermal mass while providing a positive impact on the environment.

Mixture of Materials 
Hempcrete is made of the inner woody core of the hemp plant (hemp shives) mixed with a lime-based binder and water. The lime-based binder typically consists of either hydrated lime or natural hydraulic lime. Hydrated lime is made from pure limestone and sets through the absorption of CO2 during the carbonation process. When dealing with time constraints, hydraulic binders are used in combination with regular hydrated lime because the set time for hempcrete will be less than that of regular limes (about two weeks to a month to gain adequate strength). For example, a small fraction of cement and/or pozzolanic binder is added to speed up the setting time as well. The overall process creates a mixture that will develop into a solid, but light and durable product.

Applications 
Hempcrete has been used in France since the early 1990s, and more recently in Canada, to construct non-weight bearing insulating infill walls, as hempcrete does not have the requisite strength for constructing foundation and is instead supported by the frame.
Hempcrete was also used to renovate old buildings made of stone or lime. France continues to be an avid user of hempcrete, and it grows in popularity there annually. Canada has followed France's direction in the organic building technologies sector, and hempcrete has become a growing innovation in Ontario and Quebec. There are two primary construction techniques used right now for implementing hempcrete. The first technique consists of using forms to cast or spray hempcrete directly in place on the construction site. The second technique consists of stacking prefabricated blocks that are delivered to the project site similar to masonry construction. Once hempcrete technology is implemented between timber framing, drywall or plaster is added for aesthetics and increased durability.

Mechanical Properties 
Typically, hempcrete has a low mechanical performance. Hempcrete is a fairly new material and is still being studied. Several items affect the mechanical properties of hempcrete such as aggregate size, type of binder, proportions within the mixture, manufacturing method, molding method, and compaction energy. All studies show variability within hempcrete properties and determine that it is sensitive to many factors. A study was conducted that focuses on the variability and statistical significance of hempcrete properties by analyzing two sizes of hempcrete columns with hemp from two different distributors under a normal distribution. The coefficient of variance (COV) indicates the dispersion of experimental results and is important in understanding the variability among hempcrete properties. It is important to note that young’s modulus continually has a high COV across multiple experiments. The young’s modulus of hempcrete is 22.5MPA. Young’s modulus and compressive strength are two mechanical properties that are correlated. The compressive strength is typically around 0.3MPA. Due to the lower compressive strength, hempcrete cannot be used for load-bearing elements in construction. Density is affected by drying kinetics, with a larger specific area the drying time decreases. The size of the specimen and the hemp shives should be accounted for when determining the density. In the model, the density of hempcrete is 415kg/m3 with an average coefficient of variance (COV) of 6.4%.

Due to the large variety of hemp, the porosity differs from one type to another, therefore its thermal insulating abilities vary too. The lower the density, the lower the heat transfer coefficient, a characteristic of insulating materials. On three cubic samples of hempcrete after 28 days of drying the heat transfer coefficient was measured using ISOMET 2114, a portable system for measuring the heat transfer of properties. Hempcrete has a coefficient of heat transfer of 0.0652W/m*K and a specific weight of 296kg/m3. Attention should be paid to mixing the hempcrete, as it influences the properties of the material. Further testing needs to be conducted in correlation to specimen size to determine the influence that size has on the properties of hempcrete. 

Hempcrete's low density material and resistance to cracking under movement, make it suitable for use in earthquake-prone areas. Hempcrete walls must be used together with a frame of another material that supports the vertical load in building construction, as hempcrete's density is 15% that of traditional concrete. Hempcrete walls are fireproof, transmit humidity, resist mould, and have excellent acoustic performance. Limecrete, Ltd. (UK) reports a fire resistance rating of 1 hour per British/EU standards.

In the United States, a permit is needed for the use of hemp in building.

The porosity of hempcrete falls within the range of 71.1% to 84.3% by volume. The average specific heat capacity of the hempcrete ranges from 1000 J/kg K to 1700 J/kg K. The dry thermal conductivity of hempcrete ranges from 0.05 W/mK to 0.138 W/mK. The low thermal diffusivity (1.48 x 10−7 m2/s) and effusivity (286 J/m2Ks-1/2) of hempcrete influence longer times for temperature change and create a warm sensation on the touch. Low thermal diffusivity directly relates to increased thermal comfort within the building.

Benefits and Constraints 
Hempcrete materials are a product of a type of binder and hemp shives size and quality, and the proportions in the mixture can greatly affect its properties and performance. The most notable limiting factor with hempcrete is the low mechanical performance. Due to low mechanical performance, the material should not be used for load-bearing structures. 

Although it is not known for its strength, hempcrete provides a high vapor permeability that allows for better control of temperature in an indoor environment. It can also be used as a filling material in frame structures and be used to make prefabricated panels. Altering the density of hempcrete mixtures also affects its use. Higher-density hempcrete mixtures are used for floor and roof insulation, while lower-density mixtures are used for indoor insulation and outdoor plasters. Hempcrete block walls can be laid without any covering or can be covered with finishing plasters. This latter uses the same hempcrete mixture but in different proportions. Since hempcrete contains a plant-based compound, walls need to be built with a joint in between the wall and ground to prevent capillary rising of water and runoff, blacks need to be installed above ground level and exterior walls should be protected with sand and plasters to avoid rotting shives.

Life Cycle Analysis 
Just like any crop, hemp absorbs CO2 from the atmosphere while growing, so hempcrete is considered a carbon-storing material.  A hempcrete block continually stores CO2 during its entire life, from fabrication to end-of-life, creating positive environmental benefits.  Through a life cycle assessment (LCA) of hempcrete blocks using research and X-ray Powder Diffraction (XRPD), it was found that the blocks store a large quantity of carbon from photosynthesis during plant growth and by carbonation during the use phase of the blocks.  The LCA of hempcrete blocks considers seven unit processes; hemp shives and production, binder production, transport of raw materials to the manufacturing company, hempcrete blocks production processes, transport of hempcrete blocks to the construction site, wall construction, and the use phase. The impact assessment of each process was analyzed using the following impact categories; abiotic depletion (ADP), fossil fuel depletion (ADP Fossil), global warming over a time interval of 100 years (GWP), ozone depletion (ODP), acidification (AP), eutrophication (EP), and photochemical ozone creation (POCP). 

The binder production provides the largest environmental impact while the transport phases are the second. During binder production in the lime calcination and clinker creation portion, the emissions are the most notable. A large amount of diesel consumption in the transport phases and during the manufacturing of hemp shives created a large portion of the cumulative energy demand and along with the calcination of lime which takes place in kilns, is a main source of fossil fuel emissions. Abiotic depletion is mostly attributed to the electricity used during binder production and although minimal, also during the block production processes. It is important to focus on the water content in a hempcrete mixture, because too much water can cause slow drying and create a negative impact, preventing lime carbonation. 

The main cause of the environmental footprint for hempcrete comes from the production of the binder. Reports have estimated that 18.5% - 38.4% of initial emissions from binder production can be recovered through the carbonation process. The specific amount of carbonates in the blocks actually increases with the age of the block. During the growth of hemp the plant absorbs CO2, the binder begins to absorb CO2 after the mixing process, and the wall absorbs CO2 counteracting the greenhouse emissions, by acting as a carbon sink. A hempcrete block will continue to store carbon throughout its life and can be crushed and used again as a filler for insulation. The amount of CO2 capture within the net life cycle CO2 emissions of hempcrete is estimated to be between -1.6 to -79 kg CO2e/m2. There is a correlation that increasing the mass of the binder which increases the mixture density will increase the total estimated carbon uptake via carbonation.

The impacts arising from indirect land use changes of hemp cultivation, maintenance work, and end-of-life need to be studied to create a full cradle-to-grave environmental impact profile of hempcrete blocks. To counteract the negative environmental impacts that hempcrete blocks have on the environment the transport distances should be shortened as much as possible. Furthermore, since hempcrete is not typically load-bearing, ratios should be explored to possibly completely remove the cement from the mixture.

Summary 
Hempcrete is a fairly new natural building material whose usage has increased throughout European countries in recent years and is gaining traction within the United States. The Hemp Building Foundation submitted paperwork to the International Residential Codes (IRC) in February 2022 to certify the material as a national building material, allowing the construction industry to gain more familiarity with the material.  Hempcrete is a construction building material that uses hemp shives, aggregate, water, and a type of binder to act as non-bearing walls, insulators, finishing plasters, and blocks. The material has low mechanical properties and low thermal conductivity, making it ideal for insulation material. Hempcrete blocks have a low carbon footprint and are effectively carbon sinks. Widespread codes and specifications still need to be developed for the widespread usage of hempcrete, but it shows promise to replace current non-bearing construction materials that negatively impact the environment.

See also
 Fiber-reinforced concrete

References

Further reading

External links

 Hemcrete application data from Limetechnology

Appropriate technology
Building materials
Concrete
Hemp products
Masonry